Brickellia robinsoniana  is a Mexican species of flowering plants in the family Asteraceae. It is native to north-central Mexico in the state of Zacatecas.

The species is named for American botanist Benjamin Lincoln Robinson, 1864–1935.

References

robinsoniana
Flora of Zacatecas
Plants described in 1941